Jan Sládek (23 February 1907 – 11 June 1984) was a Czech gymnast. He competed in eight events at the 1936 Summer Olympics.

References

External links
 

1907 births
1984 deaths
People from Vracov
People from the Margraviate of Moravia
Czech male artistic gymnasts
Olympic gymnasts of Czechoslovakia
Gymnasts at the 1936 Summer Olympics
Sportspeople from the South Moravian Region